Chaudes-Aigues is a commune in the Cantal department in south-central France. It is a spa town, famous for its hot spring waters.

Geography
The commune is situated in the Massif Central in Aubrac. Its inhabitants are called the Caldaguès, from the Latin meaning 'hot waters', or in French, eaux chaudes; hence the name of the commune, Chaudes-Aigues

As its name suggests, there are thirty natural hot water sources with temperatures ranging from 45° to more than 80°. The most famous is the source of the Par river with a water temperature of 82° - the hottest in Europe - with a flow in the region of 450,000 litres a day. One local story suggests that the source is so-named because a pig was dressed (paré) or jointed thanks to the hot water. The waters were known to the Romans, and are used all year round. In winter, they have provided heat for houses and the church as district heating since the 14th Century; from spring the waters are channeled to the spa for the treatment of rheumatics.

The Remontalou crosses the commune.

Population

Sights
The Château de Couffour is a ruined castle, dating back to the 15th century, situated in the commune.

See also
Communes of the Cantal department

References

External links
 Official site 

Communes of Cantal
Spa towns in France
Cantal communes articles needing translation from French Wikipedia